Orion Health is a New Zealand-based global software company that delivers and sells healthcare software. It provides the software for healthcare providers (public healthcare and private healthcare organisations) from integration through to population health management and precision medicine. It has more than 450 customers in 25 countries and over 600 staff globally.

Overview
The company is involved with the development of Integrated Health Records branded as Integrated Digital Care Records in the British National Health Service. and as Health Information Exchanges (HIEs) in the USA. Its Amadeus software has been praised for its integrative capacity, and the ability to analyse data in real time.

History 

The company founder and current CEO is Ian McCrae. The company's head office is in Grafton, Auckland, New Zealand. Orion Health was a privately owned company for over 20 years. Orion Health became a public organisation on 26 November 2014 when it listed on the NZX. It has not registered a profit since, and in April 2017 market analysts were suggesting that it was in serious trouble.  The company said it was looking for a capital injection from new investors. In February 2018, Orion Health launched a cloud-based Rhapsody integration on Amazon Web Services (AWS). In March 2019 shares were compulsorily acquired by Ian McCrae for $1.224 per share, a large drop from their $5.70 IPO share price causing widespread losses to early investors. Orion Health was then de-listed from the Australian Stock Exchange and the New Zealand Stock Exchange, becoming again a privately held company.

In 2016 Orion Health partnered with the University of Auckland and the Waitemata District Health Board to develop one of New Zealand's largest data science research initiatives called Precision Driven Health In 2017 the Precision Driven Health partnership received the Research and Business Partnership Award at the KiwiNet Research Commercialisation Awards.

In 2019 Orion Health delivered the first Health Information Exchange (HIE) in the Middle East. The system allows health providers to view and store data for more than 50 million people. This is expected to be the "world's largest" HIE containing data from approximately 5,000 private and government healthcare providers.

Locations 
Orion Health has been headquartered in Auckland, New Zealand since its 1993 inception, with its current premises opened in 2010. In 2015 Orion Health chose the Scottsdale Airpark area for its North American operations centre.

References 

Electronic health record software companies
Companies based in Auckland
Medical technology companies of New Zealand